Alfred Wiener (16 March 1885, Potsdam – 4 February 1964, London) was a German Jew who dedicated much of his life to documenting antisemitism and racism in Germany and Europe, and uncovering crimes of Germany's Nazi government. He is best remembered as the founder and long-time director of the Wiener Library.

Biography
Wiener trained as an Arabist and spent the years 1909 – 1911 in the Middle East. He fought in the First World War, winning the Iron Cross 2nd Class. From 1919, he was a high-ranking official in the Centralverein deutscher Staatsbürger jüdischen Glaubens (Central Association of German Citizens of Jewish Faith, CV), and identified the Nazi Party as the chief danger to the Jews of Germany and to German society as a whole as early as 1925. Wiener's first wife, Margarete, died shortly after being released from Bergen-Belsen concentration camp on the way to Switzerland in 1945. In 1953, he married Lotte Philips. Wiener became a naturalized British citizen in 1946.

Anti-Nazi activities
In 1928, Wiener was instrumental in creating the Büro Wilhelmstrasse of the CV, which documented Nazi activities and issued anti-Nazi materials until 1933 when Hitler came to power. Wiener and his family fled to Amsterdam where he, together with Dr. David Cohen of Amsterdam University, founded the Jewish Central Information Office (JCIO). In 1939 he and the collection transferred to London.

Wiener spent most of the war years in the USA, collecting materials for the JCIO and working for the British and American governments. He returned in 1945 to transform the Information Office into a library and centre for the scholarly study of the Nazi era.

From the mid-1950s, Wiener travelled frequently to Germany to speak to groups of young people and establish contact with Christian groups.

Two of his pamphlets he originally published in German in Germany, Prelude to Pogroms? Facts for the Thoughtful (1919) and German Judaism in Political, Economic and Cultural Terms (1924), were published together in English translation as The Fatherland and the Jews in 2021.

Awards
In 1955, Wiener was awarded the highest civilian decoration of West Germany, the Grand Cross of the Order of Merit (Grosses Verdienstkreuz des Verdienstordens).

References

Further reading 
 Ben Barkow: Alfred Wiener and the making of the Holocaust Library, London: Vallentine Mitchell 1997, 
 Jüdisches Wochenblatt, B247, a digitized periodical edited by Wiener, at the Leo Baeck Institute, New York

1885 births
1964 deaths
Scholars of antisemitism
Commanders Crosses of the Order of Merit of the Federal Republic of Germany
German Jewish military personnel of World War I
Jewish emigrants from Nazi Germany to the United States
People from Potsdam
Wiener Library
Recipients of the Iron Cross (1914), 2nd class